11β-Hydroxytestosterone is an endogenous steroid, a metabolite of testosterone.

See also
 Testosterone
 Steroid 11β-hydroxylase
 4-Hydroxytestosterone
 11-Ketotestosterone

References

Androstanes